Linux User & Developer was a monthly magazine about Linux and related Free and open source software published by Future.  It was a UK magazine written specifically for Linux professionals and IT decision makers. It was available worldwide in newsagents or via subscription, and it could be downloaded via Zinio or Apple's Newsstand.

History and profile
Linux User & Developer was first published in September 1999. In August 2014 its sister magazine, RasPi, was launched.
The last issue of Linux User & developer was on 20 September 2018 (#196). All previous subscribers received issues of Linux Format as compensation for the next remaining issues of their subscription.

Staff
Chris Thornett - Editor

References

External links
Official homepage
Digital Editions of the Magazine

Defunct computer magazines published in the United Kingdom
Linux magazines
Magazines established in 1999
Magazines disestablished in 2018
Monthly magazines published in the United Kingdom
1999 establishments in the United Kingdom